Reinkaos (stylised  as REINKAΩS) is the third and final studio album by Swedish black/melodic death metal band Dissection. It was released through the band's own label Black Horizon Music, which they had formed "out of the need of taking charge of our own business and making things our own way, without compromise". Reinkaos is also available as autographed limited first edition: CD packed in exclusive embossed slipcase, limited to 1,001 hand-numbered copies signed by the band members; including the music video for "Starless Aeon" and a sticker.

Musical style and lyrics 
The album is less influenced by traditional black metal and closer to Gothenburg metal or traditional heavy metal than Dissection's former albums, but, according to Decibel journalist Chris D., still "very much Nödtveidt and very much Dissection". The lyrics reflect the occult tenets of the Misanthropic Luciferian Order (MLO) and are "based on invocations and formulas that have been linked into the lyrics to evoke the powers that they represent. Occult musical theory has been applied in the song writing process as a means of symbolically charging their structures. They have also been written inspired by scientific ideas such as string theory etc. The songs have all been written with the intention of using sounds and vibrations as an Anti-Cosmic tool and they have all been consciously created to be the vessels for these powers." In the grimoire Liber Azerate, released by the MLO, reinchaos is defined as "the return to chaos and acausal existence."

Track listing

Personnel 
 Jon Nödtveidt − vocals, guitars
 Set Teitan − guitars, backing vocals
 Tomas Asklund − drums

Guest appearances 
 Brice Leclercq − bass
 Additional vocals on "Maha Kali" by Nyx 218
 Additional backing vocals by Erik Danielsson and Whiplasher Bernadotte

References 

Dissection (band) albums
2006 albums
The End Records albums
Melodic death metal albums